Don Scott is an American politician. A Democrat, he is a member of the Virginia House of Delegates, representing the 80th district. He was elected Minority Leader of the Virginia House of Delegates on June 1, 2022.

Biography
Scott was born and raised in Houston, Texas as one of six children, and graduated from Texas A&M University with a degree in agriculture. Following his undergraduate education, Scott served as a Naval Officer.  Following his honorable discharge, he obtained a J.D. degree from Louisiana State University Law School.

In 1994, Scott was arrested on federal drug charges, and served seven years in prison. Later, he acknowledged his mistakes, and said that the experience motivated him, and showed him injustices of the legal system. Following his release from prison, Scott took an entry-level position at KRA Corporation, where he eventually became senior vice president and relocated to Portsmouth, Virginia.

In 2015, Scott was admitted to the bar and opened his own firm, where he practices criminal defense, family law, and civil cases.

In 2021, Scott donated a kidney to his next-door neighbor, Virginia Circuit Court Judge Johnny E. Morrison.

Political career

2019
Scott filed to run to represent the 80th district in the 2019 Virginia House of Delegates election after the resignation of Matthew James, who was appointed by Governor Ralph Northam to an executive position. Scott was unopposed in the primaries, and in the general election defeated Republican James W. Evans and Independent Ryan Benton  with 66.01% of the vote.

2020

In March 2020, Scott endorsed former U.S. Vice President Joe Biden in the 2020 Democratic Primary.

2021
Scott was unopposed in the primaries, and in the general election defeated Republican 	Deanna Stanton with 66.01% of the vote.

2022 
After his party lost 7 seats and control of the House, Scott led a party rebellion to oust former Speaker and party leader Eileen Filler-Corn. Along with fellow Delegates Dan Helmer and Sally Hudson, both of whom were also first elected in 2019, Scott led a vote of no confidence. However, the Democratic Delegates could not agree on who to install as the new leader so the position went vacant for over a month, while Caucus Chair Charniele Herring, who sustained her own vote of no confidence, went as acting leader, until Scott defeated her on June 1.

References

21st-century African-American politicians
21st-century American politicians
African-American state legislators in Virginia
Democratic Party members of the Virginia House of Delegates
Living people
Louisiana State University Law Center alumni
Politicians from Houston
Politicians from Portsmouth, Virginia
Texas A&M University alumni
Year of birth missing (living people)